Ptycholoma lecheana, the Leche's twist moth, is a moth of the family Tortricidae. It is found in Europe, China (Heilongjiang, Jilin, Hunan), Korea, Japan, Russia (Amur, Ussuri) and Asia Minor.

The wingspan is 16–20 mm. The forewings have the termen nearly straight, rather oblique, and a strong costal fold from the base to the middle. The ground colour is dark fuscous, more or less densely irrorated or suffused with ferruginous-ochreous. The edges of the central fascia and the apex of the costal patch are more or less defined by leaden -metallic lines. The hindwings are blackish-grey. The larva is light green, above blackish-green; spots pale; head light brown.

The moth flies from late May to early June in China and to July in western Europe.

The larvae feed on various trees and shrubs, including Acer, Betula, Crataegus pinnatifida, Fagus, Larix leptolepis, Populus, Prunus padus, Pyrus, Quercus, Salix koreensis, Sorbus, Tilia and Ulmus species. The species overwinters in the larval stage within a shelter made of a spun web in crevices of barks of their host plant.

References

External links
 
 waarneming.nl .
 Lepidoptera of Belgium
 Ptycholoma lecheana at UKMoths

Archipini
Moths described in 1758
Moths of Asia
Moths of Europe
Taxa named by Carl Linnaeus